Germinal Pierre Dandelin (12 April 1794 – 15 February 1847) was a French mathematician, soldier, and professor of engineering.

Life
He was born near Paris to a French father and Belgian mother, studying first at Ghent then returning to Paris to study at the École Polytechnique. He was wounded fighting under Napoleon.  He worked for the Ministry of the Interior under Lazare Carnot. Later he became a citizen of the Netherlands, a professor of mining engineering in Belgium, and then a member of the Belgian army.

Work
He is the eponym of the Dandelin spheres, of Dandelin's theorem in geometry (for an account of that theorem, see Dandelin spheres), and of the Dandelin–Gräffe numerical method of solution of algebraic equations. He also published on the stereographic projection, algebra, and probability theory.

References
 Biography in Dictionary of Scientific Biography (New York 1970–1990). 
 Florian Cajori, The Dandelin–Gräffe method, in A history of Mathematics (New York, 1938), 364.
 A. S. Householder, Dandelin, Lobachevskii, or Gräffe?, American Mathematical Monthly 66 (1959), 464–466.
 A. Quetelet, G P Dandelin, Biographie nationale XIV (Brussels,1873), 663–668.
 C. Runge, The Dandelin–Gräffe method, in Praxis der Gleichungen (Berlin-Leipzig, 1921), 136–158.

Further reading

External links

1794 births
1847 deaths
19th-century French mathematicians
19th-century Belgian mathematicians
Belgian mining engineers
19th-century Dutch mathematicians
Dutch mining engineers
People from Seine-Saint-Denis
19th-century Dutch engineers
19th-century Belgian engineers